Kotłówka may refer to the following places:
Kotłówka, Masovian Voivodeship (east-central Poland)
Kotłówka, Podlaskie Voivodeship (north-east Poland)
Kotłówka, Pomeranian Voivodeship (north Poland)